Garw Valley (Welsh: Cwm Garw) is a community and coterminous electoral ward in the north of Bridgend County Borough, South Wales. As the name suggests, it follows and encompasses the valley of the River Garw. The community includes the village of Blaengarw at the head of the valley, followed by Pontycymer and Llangeinor on the river, with Bettws between the Garw and the Llynfi in the south. Garw Valley is bordered to the west by Maesteg, Llangynwyd Middle and Llangynwyd Lower; to the east by Ogmore Valley and to the south by Ynysawdre and St Bride's Minor.

Attractions include the Garw Valley Railway, a four and half mile narrow gauge steam railway, which volunteers began re-laying in 2016. Passenger rail services had previously ceased in the valley in 1991.

Governance
At the local level, Garw Valley elects 13 community councillors to Garw Valley Community Council, from the four wards of Bettws, Llangeinor, Pontycymmer and Blaengarw.

At the county level, until 2022 the community was covered by four electoral wards, of Blaengarw, Pontycymmer, Llangeinor and Bettws, each electing one county councillor to Bridgend County Borough Council. Following a boundary review, the four wards were combined to form a new Garw Valley ward, electing three county borough councillors.

References

External links
 Garw Valley Community Council website
 TheGarwValley.org
 GarwValley.co.uk

Communities in Bridgend County Borough
Valleys of Bridgend County Borough
Wards of Bridgend County Borough